Balwanta is a village in Ajmer tehsil of Ajmer district of Rajasthan state in India.The village falls under Danta gram panchayat.

Demography 
As per 2011 census of India, Balwanta has population of 3,019 of which 1,552 are males and 1,467 are females. Sex ratio of the village is 945.

Transportation
Balwanta is connected by air (Kishangarh Airport), by train (Ajmer Junction railway station) and by road.

See also
Ajmer Tehsil

References

Villages in Ajmer district